Appy Entertainment, Inc., was an American video-game developer focusing primarily on mobile and tablet devices. Their most popular app was FaceFighter. The company since to have shutdown around 2014.

Company information
Appy Entertainment was founded on  October 31, 2008, by Chris Ulm, Farzad Varahramyan, Paul O'Connor, Rick Olafsson, and Emmanuel Valdez - all former executives of High Moon Studios.

Appy was located at their "Secret Worldwide Headquarters", a loft-style office above an Irish Pub in Carlsbad, California.

Appy released a number of apps with over 20 million downloads.

In September 2011, they reached a milestone of 10 million iOS downloaded on the FaceFighter app.

Product pricing
While Appy began with a traditional premium pricing approach for their games, at some point switched to a free-to-play model. They also changed the pricing model of existing games like Trucks & Skulls from premium to free-to-play monetization.

References

External links
 Appy Entertainment official site (From Archive.org)
 Appy Entertainment development blog

Software companies based in California
Defunct video game companies of the United States